The William Oakland Round Barn is an historic building located near Blairsburg in rural Hamilton County, Iowa, United States. The true round barn measures  in diameter. It is constructed of clay tiles and features a conical roof, aerator, a small dormer on the west side and a larger one on the east side as well as a  central silo. William T. Oakland had this structure built in 1910 as a combination hog and sale barn. The ground floor was used for farrowing, while the sale ring was on the upper level. The 16 windows in roof provided light to the sales area. The barn has been listed on the National Register of Historic Places since 1986.

References

Barns on the National Register of Historic Places in Iowa
Buildings and structures completed in 1910
Buildings and structures in Hamilton County, Iowa
Round barns in Iowa
National Register of Historic Places in Hamilton County, Iowa